Echinolittorina placida is a species of sea snail, a marine gastropod mollusc in the family Littorinidae, the winkles. This species was not described until 2009 because it had previously been confused with, and not differentiated from, a similar-looking species, Echinolittorina interrupta.

Distribution 
This species occurs in the Gulf of Mexico.

Habitat
Rocks or other hard substrates of the splash zone (supralittoral) 
where they spend most of their time out of the water. 
A herbivorous species that feeds on microscopic marine algae, growing on rocks.

References

Littorinidae
Gastropods described in 2009